Käraste Bröder Systrar och Vänner (Dearest Brothers, Sisters and Friends) is Epistle No. 9 in the Swedish poet and performer Carl Michael Bellman's 1790 song collection, Fredman's Epistles. 
The epistle is subtitled with the  dedication "Til Gumman på Thermopolium Boreale och hännes Jungfrur." ("To the old Woman at Thermopolium Boreale and her Maidens"), Barbara Ekenberg. It describes the fictional Jean Fredman's cheerful world of brandy, women, and dance, in the setting of a tavern which is halfway to a brothel. The song ends with Fredman's credo, a celebration of everything that is delightful in life.

Background

Song

Music and verse form 

The Epistle was written in the spring of 1770. The melody was initially thought to have been based on the 1768 French air du drapeau called "Tout n'est que vanité" from Bonafos de la Tour's Cantiques, but Bellman's timbre "Menuet" shows that he was using an instrumental tune, not a sung canticle. As usual, Bellman modified the melody to suit the song. There are four stanzas, each consisting of 16 lines, with cello interludes. The rhyming scheme is AABC-DDBC-BB-CEE-FFE.

Lyrics 

The subtitle text is "Til Gumman på Thermopolium Boreale och hännes Jungfrur." ("To the old Woman at Thermopolium Boreale and her Maidens."). The locale was a coffee-shop in Myntgränden, an alleyway in Stockholm's Gamla stan, run by Barbara Ekenberg. Coffee was at that time an expensive luxury. The drunken revelries, brandy, music, and dancing girls indicate however that the establishment was halfway to being a brothel.

Reception and legacy 

Carina Burman writes in her biography of Bellman that the song is one of the best-known of the early Epistles, and that it ends with Fredman's credo, a celebration of everything that is delightful in life, with drunkenness, dance, and love. These form one side of Fredman's world, she comments; the other side being anxiety, hangovers, and longing for death. Bellman himself keeps out of the fiction, with Fredman as the audience's eyes and ears. She notes that Fredman has been likened to a master of ceremonies, calling out the songs and explaining the action like an overenthusiastic tour guide. In the 18th century, ceremonies were fundamental, guiding individuals through life and through society. Through Fredman's eyes, however, the epistles never offer a sober, objective point of view. Epistle 9 presents, she writes, his typical mixture of elegance and drunkenness: "Käraste systrar, alltid honnett; / bröderna dansar jämt menuett, / hela natten fulla. / Rak i livet, Ulla, / ge nu hand, håll takten rätt!" (Dearest sisters, always honest; brothers always dance the minuet, drunk all night long. Stand straight, Ulla, give me your hand, keep to the time!) 
The Bellman Society calls the epistle much loved, succinctly stating the essence of Fredman's world with its "Här är Bacchus buden, här är Kärleks Guden, här är all ting, här är jag." (Here is Bacchus bidden, here is the God of Love, here is everything, here am I.").

The Epistle has been recorded by the actor Mikael Samuelson on his 1988 album Carl Michael Bellman, and by the troubadour Fred Åkerström on his 1977 album Vila vid denna källa, where it is the first track.

References

Sources

 
 
 
  (contains the most popular Epistles and Songs, in Swedish, with sheet music)
  (with facsimiles of sheet music from first editions in 1790, 1791)

External links 

 Text of Epistle 9 at Bellman.net

1770 compositions 
Swedish songs
Fredmans epistlar